Culture and Recreation Park ( or) is a communal forest in Gliwice. Inside the park is located castle forest.

Objects
 steel tube stations.
 castle forest
 playground

References

Gliwice
Parks in Silesian Voivodeship